The C4-dicarboxylate uptake C family or DcuC family (TC# 2.A.61) is a family of transmembrane ion transporters found in bacteria. A representative list of proteins belonging to the DcuC family can be found in the Transporter Classification Database.

An anaerobic C4-dicarboxylate transporter (DcuC) of E. coli (TC# 2.A.61.1.1) has 14 putative transmembrane regions, is induced only under anaerobic conditions, and is not repressed by glucose. DcuC may therefore function as a succinate efflux system during anaerobic glucose fermentation. However, when overexpressed, it can replace either DcuA or DcuB in catalysing fumarate-succinate exchange and fumarate uptake. DcuC shows the same transport modes as DcuA and DcuB (exchange, uptake, and presumably efflux of C4-dicarboxylates).

The reactions probably catalyzed by the E. coli DcuC protein are:
 C4-dicarboxylate (out) + nH+ (out) → C4-dicarboxylate (in) + nH+ (in)
 C4-dicarboxylate1 (out) + C4-dicarboxylate2 (in) ⇌ C4-dicarboxylate1 (in) + C4-dicarboxylate2 (out).

See also 
 Dicarboxylate 
 Dcu family

References 

Protein families
Transmembrane transporters